Euphaedra vicina, or the glossy white-striped forester, is a butterfly in the family Nymphalidae. It is found in Nigeria, Cameroon, the Democratic Republic of the Congo and Uganda. The habitat consists of forests.

Subspecies
Euphaedra vicina vicina (Cameroon to the Democratic Republic of the Congo, Uganda)
Euphaedra vicina longiqua Hecq, 1984 (Nigeria: Cross River loop)
Euphaedra vicina pallidoides Hecq, 1984 (Democratic Republic of the Congo: Shaba)

References

Butterflies described in 1984
vicina